The desert lidless skink (Ablepharus deserti) is a species of skink native to southern Kazakhstan, Kyrgyzstan, northern Tajikistan, Uzbekistan and eastern Turkmenistan.

References

External links

Reptiles described in 1868
Reptiles of Central Asia
Ablepharus
Taxa named by Alexander Strauch